Mollie Green (born 4 August 1997) is an English footballer who plays as a midfielder for Coventry United on loan from Birmingham City in the FA Women's Championship.

She has previously played for Everton, Liverpool, and Manchester United in the FA WSL, Sheffield United in the FA Women's Championship, and has represented England at the under-19 level.

Club career

Liverpool
Green joined Liverpool in 2014, progressing through the club's Centre of Excellence. On 11 October 2015, she made her competitive debut as a 72nd-minute substitute for Rosie White in the semi-final of the FA WSL Cup, a 2–0 defeat against Notts County. A year later, she made her FA WSL debut in a 3–1 win against Doncaster Rovers Belles. During her 3-year stint at Liverpool, she made three appearances for the senior team.

Everton
On 28 March 2017, having seen limited minutes for the Reds, Green made the move to their Merseyside rivals Everton in search of more playing time. 
The following month, she made her Everton debut in a 2–1 defeat against Millwall Lionesses in the FA WSL 2 Spring Series. Green scored her first Everton goal in a 4–0 win against London Bees to help clinch the 2017 Spring Series title.

After the 2017–18 season, Green and Everton mutually agreed to terminate her contract.

Manchester United

2018–19 season
 
On 13 July 2018, it was announced that Green would join newly-formed Championship side Manchester United in their inaugural season. She made her competitive debut for Manchester United in a 1–0 League Cup victory against Liverpool on 19 August. She scored her first goal in the opening game of the 2018–19 FA Women's Championship season, a 12–0 win away to Aston Villa. On 25 November, she scored her first career hat-trick in an 8–0 win over Millwall. In total, Green scored 5 goals in 3 games on the way to being named FA Women's Championship player of the month for November.

2019–20 season: Loan to Sheffield United
On 11 January 2020, having only made two League Cup appearances for Manchester United in the 2019–20 season, Green joined Championship side Sheffield United on loan for the remainder of the season. She made her debut for the team the next day, coming on as a substitute in 1–0 defeat to promotion rivals Aston Villa. Green scored her first goal for Sheffield United, on her first start, in a 5–0 league win against Coventry United on 19 January 2020. The loan was ultimately cut short due to the suspension and eventual cancellation of the remainder of the season during the coronavirus pandemic.

Birmingham City
On 4 September 2020, it was announced Green's Manchester United contract had been terminated by mutual consent. Three days later, Birmingham City announced her signing, reuniting Green with newly-appointed manager Carla Ward who had taken Green on loan at Sheffield United the previous season.

International career
In 2015, Green made her England under-19 debut in a 2–2 draw against Norway. In July 2015, Green was named in the England under-19 squad for the UEFA Women's Under-19 Championship in Israel. England finished bottom of group B and did not progress.

Personal life
Green attended Savio Salesian College.

Career statistics

Club
.

Honours

Club
Everton
FA WSL 2 Spring Series: 2017

Manchester United
 FA Women's Championship: 2018–19

Individual
 FA Women's Championship Player of the Month: November 2018

References

External links

 Profile at the Manchester United F.C. website
 
 

Living people
English women's footballers
Liverpool F.C. Women players
Everton F.C. (women) players
Manchester United W.F.C. players
Sheffield United W.F.C. players
Birmingham City W.F.C. players
Women's Super League players
1997 births
Women's association football midfielders
Coventry United W.F.C. players
Women's Championship (England) players